Rasheed Baloch (born April 7, 1972) is an Olympian & professional Pakistani Boxer. As an amateur, he was one of the best to ever come from Pakistan and was the Pakistan captain from 1997 to 1998. He took part in the 1996 Olympic games he won his first fight against a Mexican Boxer & lost 2nd match against Kazakhstan Boxer in 67 kg.

In the previous year he took Silver in the South Asian Games. (Gold) in Agon Cup Malaysia, Quaid-i-Azam International Cup (gold) KESC Cup (silver) Cardin Cup Cuba (bronze) Green Hill Cup (silver).  Having a successful amateur career, he moved to Japan and turned pro in 1999. Rasheed fought Joel Burke for the NSW Middleweight Title in 2001 which he won by TKO 5th round.

He went on to fight for the vacant OBA light middleweight title against John Wayne Parr but lost cause of broken right hand.

(Pakistan champion            1993-1998)
(National Games               1997-98)
(7th Saf Games India          1995)
(Agon Cup Malaysia            1995)
(China Cup China              1995)
(KESC International cup       1995)
(9th Mayor's cup Philippines  1996)
(Cardin Cup Cuba              1996)
(Atlanta Olympics             1996)
(Asian Championship Malaysia  1997)
(10th Mayor's Cup Philippines 1998)
(Green Hill Cup Pakistan      1998)
(Asian Games Thailand         1998)
In 1999 He turned pro by going Tokyo Japan 
2001 Australia where he won NSW title in middleweight 
2004-5 He went to Liberia training Pakistan Army boxing team in United nation mission 
2007 Back to Australia for another fight then moved to New Zealand for few more fights and retired from boxing in 2014 with the record of 6 wins out of 18 professional fights. 
In 2016 He introduced professional boxing in Pakistan and the first commission was named Pakistan Boxing Association and in 2017 he formed Pakistan Professional Boxing Federation which we changed it to Pakistan Boxing Council and became its first president.

External links
Home page

Youtube page

Commonwealth Games competitors for Pakistan
Boxers at the 1994 Commonwealth Games
Olympic boxers of Pakistan
Boxers at the 1996 Summer Olympics
Living people
1972 births
Boxers at the 1994 Asian Games
Boxers at the 1998 Asian Games
Pakistani male boxers
Asian Games competitors for Pakistan
Welterweight boxers